This Chapter and Colony Roll of the Nu Sigma Nu Medical Fraternity, a co-ed Professional fraternity for medical students and related sciences, is complete through circa 1953. While the national has disbanded, several chapters remain active. Inactive chapter are shown in italics.

List of chapters

The creation of chapters may have continued, but information about those formed after 1953 was not available at the time this page was created.

References
All chapter locations and designations from either the 1903 catalog, titled Nu Sigma Nu in 1903, accessed 15 June 2014, or a Nu Sigma Nu chapter bulletin for Lambda Chapter of Pennsylvania, dated as early as 1954-55 or later. Surprisingly slight information was found in Baird's Manual of American College Fraternities, in what appears to be an omission in the 1991 version; ΝΣΝ is neither listed among dormant societies in that book, nor among the active societies. It only comes up in the opening dialog section, mentioned in the paragraphs about the early founding of many professional fraternities at Michigan.

chapters
Lists of chapters of United States student societies by society